Robert B. Redman (September 6, 1908 – June 9, 1960) was an American football, basketball, and baseball player, coach, and educator.  He served as the head football coach at Bloomsburg University of Pennsylvania from 1947 to 1951, compiling a record of 38–4 and winning three Pennsylvania State Athletic Conference champions (1948, 1949, and 1951).  After leaving Bloomsburg, Redman coached football and baseball at East Orange High School in East Orange, New Jersey from 1952 to 1956.  He served as the principal there from 1956 until 1960, when he was named superintendent of schools.  Before assuming that role, Redman died of a heart attack at the age of 51 on June 9, 1960.  Bloomsburg's home football stadium, Robert B. Redman Stadium, was named for the coach when it opened in 1974.

Head coaching record

College football

References

External links
 

1908 births
1960 deaths
American men's basketball players
School superintendents in New Jersey
Bloomsburg Huskies football coaches
Swarthmore Garnet Tide baseball players
Swarthmore Garnet Tide football players
Swarthmore Garnet Tide men's basketball players
High school baseball coaches in the United States
High school football coaches in New Jersey
American school principals
United States Navy personnel of World War II
United States Navy officers
Duke University alumni
People from Bradford County, Pennsylvania
Players of American football from Pennsylvania
Military personnel from Pennsylvania